Edgington is an unincorporated community in Rock Island County, Illinois, United States.

Demographics

History
The Edgington post office closed in 1920. The community's name honors Daniel and John Edgington, pioneer settlers.
Kate Anderson is the current Mayor of the township

References

Unincorporated communities in Rock Island County, Illinois
Unincorporated communities in Illinois